Ca’ Granda-Pratocentenaro is a station on Line 5 of the Milan Metro.

History 
The works for the construction of the first section of Line 5, which includes Ca' Granda station, began in September 2007, and it was opened on 10 February 2013.

Station structure 
Ca’ Granda-Pratocentenaro is an underground station with two tracks in one tunnel and, like all the other stations on Line 5, is wheelchair accessible.

It is located at the intersection of Viale Fulvio Testi and Viale Ca' Granda, and also has exits to Via Giuseppe Vidali.

Interchanges 
Tram lines 5 and 7 and bus stops are located near the station.

References 

Line 5 (Milan Metro) stations
Railway stations opened in 2013
2013 establishments in Italy
Railway stations in Italy opened in the 21st century